The palatopharyngeal arch (pharyngopalatine arch, posterior pillar of fauces) is larger and projects farther toward the middle line than the palatoglossal arch; it runs downward, lateralward, and backward to the side of the pharynx, and is formed by the projection of the palatopharyngeal muscle, covered by mucous membrane.

References

External links
 
 
 

Palate
Pharynx